Mohammad Alilu (also Romanized as Moḩammad ʿAlīlū; also known as Yūzqūyī) is a village in Garamduz Rural District, Garamduz District, Khoda Afarin County, East Azerbaijan Province, Iran. At the 2006 census, its population was 71, in 15 families.

References 

Populated places in Khoda Afarin County